The Audi e-tron GT is a battery electric executive car produced by Audi since late 2020 as part of the e-tron battery electric sub-brand, and the third fully electric car model, after e-tron and e-tron Sportback SUVs. Based on the J1 platform shared with the Porsche Taycan, the car went on sale in March 2021.

Overview

e-tron GT concept (2018)
The Audi e-tron GT concept prototype was unveiled in November 2018 in 2018 Los Angeles Auto Show, followed by 2019 Geneva Motor Show.

e-tron GT quattro
In November 2020, Audi released photographs of what was basically the production model, in a characteristic black and gray veneer with orange accents and overlays on the alloy wheels. The production Audi e-tron GT extensively recreated the design of the concept car, with muscular wheel arches, aggressively styled headlights, and a large hexagonal radiator grille imitation. The gently sloping roofline ends with one-piece taillights connected by a luminous strip. Unlike the concept, the production car has visible door handles.

The car shares technical components with the related Porsche Taycan. 40 percent of its parts are identical to those used in the Taycan, and the cars share the same platform. Just like the Taycan, it is a 4-door sedan despite the sporty coupé-style silhouette.

The vehicle was unveiled in 2021 IAA motor show.

Pre-order of European models began in mid-February 2021, and went on sale in 2021-05-03.

The fully electric driveline of the Audi e-tron GT is powered by a battery with 84 kWh of net capacity (93.4 kWh of gross capacity) as well as two electric motors providing all-wheel drive.

In tests performed by the automotive website Edmunds, the car surpassed its EPA rating, achieving .

RS e-tron GT (2021–)

RS e-tron GT Project_513/2 (2023)
Unveiled in March 2023, the Audi RS E-tron GT Project_513/2 is a special edition for the US market limited to 75 units, with its design taking inspiration from a prototype and featuring red accents and an e-tron camouflage script.

Production
Preparation of production at Böllinger Höfe plant started in 2019, and started in December 2020. Unlike the e-tron and e-tron Sportback models manufactured in Belgium, it is the first Audi electric car to be produced in Audi's home country Germany, at the Heilbronn plant. Audi officially unveiled the production e-tron GT on 9 February 2021 with sales started in March 2021.

Reviews and reception 
In December 2022, Bloomberg suggested the e-tron GT as good option for those consumers upset by Elon Musk's behavior who would instead consider the Model S by Tesla.

Awards
Audi e-tron GT won 2021 Goldenes Lenkrad (Golden Steering Wheel) awards under the Most Beautiful Car of the Year category.

Marketing
In the 2019 superhero film Avengers: Endgame, Tony Stark drove a black Audi e-tron GT. At this time, the car was still a concept and Marvel Studios commissioned Audi to manufacture a prototype specifically for the film. Robert Downey Jr., who plays Tony Stark, also drove the prototype to the film’s premiere.

As part of Audi's sponsorship of Spider-Man: Far From Home, the Audi e-tron GT concept appeared in a short film titled 'Science Fair', where Peter Parker (Tom Holland) tried to save his school science fair presentation with the help of an Audi e-tron GT concept.

As part of the Audi e-Tron GT launch in Hong Kong, Ian Chan of MIRROR became an e-tron brand representative in Hong Kong, and the first Hong Kong artist to own an Audi e-Tron GT.

As part of the general Audi e-Tron GT launch, fashion designer Stella McCartney, actor and producer Tom Hardy, and singer Janelle Monáe became product representatives. The slogan 'Future is an Attitude' was also used in the campaign.

See also
 Audi e-tron (brand)

References

External links
Audi page: e-tron GT concept, e-tron GT
Press kit: e-tron GT, RS e-tron GT

e-tron GT
Cars introduced in 2021
Executive cars
Sports sedans
All-wheel-drive vehicles
Electric car models
Production electric cars